HiSky is a Moldovan airline based in Chișinău, Moldova, the airline has an additional  Air Operating Certificate (AOC) in Romania. The airlines main bases are Chișinău International Airport and Cluj International Airport.

History
The company's CEO, Iulian Scorpan, is a former pilot of Air Moldova.

In February 2020, the Moldavian aviation authorities stated that HiSky currently was not granted an air operator's certificate due to irregularities found during the certification process, and that an investigation has been launched. One of the issues noted is that Cobrex Trans, the airline which was supposed to operate Airbus A320s on behalf of HiSky, does not have this aircraft type in its fleet yet. According to the Civil Aviation Authority of the Republic of Moldova, as of 12 May 2020 HiSky was still not licensed for commercial operation. At the same time, the company was offering tickets for flights originating from Chisinau over its own website. The airline had then stated its plans to launch flights in July with two Airbus A320 family aircraft from Air Lease Corporation.

HiSky was forced to delay their route launches several times in the wake of the COVID-19 pandemic. As of 18 September 2020, the airline removed their planned schedule entirely. However, on the 11th of December 2020, the airline obtained the operational certificate in Romania and on 19 February 2021 the airline has obtained the operational certificate in Moldova.

On 22 February 2021, the airline has announced it would start flying to Dublin and Lisbon from its first hub in Cluj-Napoca, Romania. From 28 April 2021, HiSky Airlines launched new flights from Chisinau to Paris, from Paris and Frankfurt to Romanian Satu Mare, from April 29th from Dublin to Iasi, from May 1st from Frankfurt to Satu Mare and from Chisinau to Frankfurt.

Destinations
As of September 2022, HiSky operates to the following destinations

Fleet

, the HiSky fleet consists of the following aircraft:

References

External links

 

Airlines of Moldova
Airlines established in 2020